Qasim Ali Shah ( born 25 December 1980) is a teacher, corporate trainer, and motivational speaker.

Career
Qasim Ali Shah works as a motivational speaker and corporate trainer. He has also worked to promote tourism in Uzbekistan.

He is the founder of the nonprofit organization Qasim Ali Shah Foundation. In 2018 he was the chairman of the book fair Lahore Festival.

In 2020, he stated in an interview that girls should go to school in order to learn how to be good wives and mothers, and that those roles are the "ultimate goals" of a woman's life. Extracts from the interview were shared on Twitter and heavily criticised.

In January 2023, Qasim was again critcised for making a statement against the chairman of Pakistan Tehreek-e-Insaf, Imran Khan.

Books
Qasim Ali Shah has written 12 books.

 Bari Manzil ka Musaafir, 2017, Ruby Publishing, 
 Kamyabi Ka Paigham, 2014, Ruby Publishing, 
 365 Aqwaal-E-Khud Shanasi, 2018, Ruby Publishing, 
 Aap Ka Bacha Kamyaab Ho Sakta Hai, 2017, Ruby Publishing, 
 Unchi Udaan, 2017, Ruby Publishing,  
 Zara Num Ho, 2017, Ruby Publishing,  
 Teacher Se Trainer Tak, 2019, Ruby Publishing,  
 Guftgu (گفتگو), Nai Soch Publishers
 ABR-E-MUSALSAL (ابر مسلسل), Nai Soch Publishers
 TARGHEEB (ترغیب), Nai Soch Publishers
 Soch Ka Hamaliya (سوچ کا ہمالیہ), Nai Soch Publishers
 Rah e Azam Mein (راہ عزم میں)

References

Living people
Motivational speakers
Urdu-language columnists
21st-century Urdu-language writers
Pakistani YouTubers
Nonprofit chief executives
1980 births
Pakistani motivational speakers
University of Engineering and Technology, Lahore alumni
Pakistani civil servants